The League of Three (German: Der Bund der Drei) is a 1929 German silent crime film directed by Hans Behrendt and starring Jenny Jugo, Max Maximilian and Ernst Stahl-Nachbaur.
The film's art direction was by Willi Herrmann. It premiered at the Ufa-Pavillon am Nollendorfplatz.

Cast
Jenny Jugo as Inez  
Max Maximilian as Diaz, Inez's Vater  
Ernst Stahl-Nachbaur as Renard  
Friedrich Benfer as Henri, Renards Sohn 
Raimondo Van Riel as Baramo  
Michael von Newlinsky as Gaston  
Kurt Katch as Morris  
Viktor Gehring as Privatdetektiv  
Alfred Beierle as Hausmeister

References

External links

Films of the Weimar Republic
German silent feature films
Films directed by Hans Behrendt
UFA GmbH films
German black-and-white films
German crime films
1929 crime films
1920s German films